Cymbidium iridioides, the iris-like cymbidium, is a species of orchid.

iridioides
Orchids of Bhutan